The Albula Alps are a mountain range in the Alps of eastern Switzerland. They are considered to be part of the Central Eastern Alps, more specifically the Western Rhaetian Alps. They are named after the river Albula. According to AVE (see map), the Albula Alps are separated from the Oberhalbstein Alps in the west by the Septimer Pass and the valley of the Sursés; from the Plessur Alps in the north-west by the Landwasser valley; from the Silvretta group in the north-east by the Flüela Pass; from the Sesvenna Alps in the east by the Inn valley (Engadine); from the Livigno Alps in the south-east by the Inn valley; from the Bernina Range in the south by the Maloja Pass and the Inn valley.

The chief summit of the Albula Alps is Piz Kesch, which is also the highest summit of the Eastern Alps north of the Inn. Other mountains with both a high elevation and a high prominence are Piz Calderas, Piz Ela, Piz Ot and Piz Vadret. The Albula Alps are drained by the rivers Albula, Gelgia, Landwasser and Inn and Mera. Near the Lunghin Pass is the tripoint between the Gelgia, Inn and Mera. This is the tripoint between the basins of the North Sea, Black Sea and Mediterranean Sea.

The main road passes crossing the Albula Alps (from central Graubünden to Engadin) are the Julier Pass and the Albula Pass. On the margin are also the Flüela Pass and the Septimer Pass (bridle path only). The Albula Pass, in the middle of the range, is also an important axis of the Rhaetian Railway, connecting Chur to St. Moritz through the Albula Tunnel. Both pass road and railway traverse the locality of Bergün on the river Albula, the most central town within the Albula Alps.

Peaks
The main peaks of the Albula Alps are:

Passes

The Albula Alps are crossed by one railway tunnel, under the Albula Pass. The main mountain passes of the Albula Alps are:

See also
 Swiss Alps
 List of mountains in Switzerland

References

 Swisstopo maps

External links

Mountain ranges of the Alps
Central Alps
Rhaetian Alps
Mountain ranges of Switzerland
Mountain ranges of Graubünden
Limestone Alps